Hajj Abd (also Romanized as Ḩājj ʿAbīd; also known as Ḩājj ‘Abd) is a village in Seyyed Abbas Rural District, Shavur District, Shush County, Khuzestan Province, Iran. At the 2006 census, its population was 107, in 18 families.

References 

Populated places in Shush County